The TV Guide Award was an annual award created by the editors of TV Guide magazine, as a readers poll to honor outstanding programs and performers in the American television industry. The awards were presented until 1964. The TV Guide Award was revived 1999–2001.

1950s
Ellery Queen won a TV Guide Award in 1950 for Best Mystery Show on Television.
The Lucky Strike ads of the early 1950s won the first TV Guide award as commercial of the year.
The trophy was a bronze statuette of a heroic figure holding a filigree globe.
The 1952 TV Guide Magazine award was given to Zoo Parade, which also won the 1950 George Foster Peabody Award and the 1951 Look TV Award.
American Bandstand was featured on its second anniversary in the Philadelphia issue of TV Guide, which said it was "the people's choice" for a 1954 TV Guide award. The magazine had been founded the year before by Walter Annenberg, owner of American Bandstand.

1960–64
In 1961 the TV Guide Award was cited by the Associated Press as one of the three important entertainment awards, together with the Academy Awards and the Emmy Awards. Ballots were printed in a single issue of the magazine. Completed ballots were submitted by U.S. Mail and tabulated by direct-mail specialists Cassidy-Richlar, Inc.

1960 awards
The TV Guide Award Show was broadcast in color on March 25, 1960, on NBC. Robert Young hosted a series of skits featuring Fred MacMurray and Nanette Fabray. Seven awards were presented in the final ten minutes of the show. Recipients were chosen based on 289,000 ballots submitted by readers of TV Guide.

1961 awards
Broadcast on NBC, the second annual TV Guide Award Show was presented June 13, 1961. The hour-long program was hosted by Efrem Zimbalist, Jr., with comedy sketches featuring Jackie Cooper and Nanette Fabray. NBC-TV was recognized for its 1960 election night coverage, and the following awards were presented.

1962 awards
The third annual TV Guide Award Show was broadcast June 24, 1962, on NBC. Hosted by Dave Garroway, the program included sketches featuring Art Carney and special guest Judy Holliday. In a brief concluding segment, awards in eight categories were presented.

1963 awards
The fourth TV Guide Award presentation was made during the NBC special, The Bob Hope Show Presenting the TV Guide Awards, broadcast April 14, 1963. The 45-minute comedy and variety portion of the show featured Dean Martin and Martha Raye. Eight awards were presented in the concluding segment of the show, with live pickups in New York and Hollywood.

1964 awards
The fifth TV Guide Award presentation was made on a special presentation of Bob Hope's NBC-TV show on April 17, 1964.

1999–2001
The TV Guide Award was revived in 1999. Categories included traditional awards like Favorite Actor in a Comedy, Favorite Actor in a Drama Series, Favorite Star in a New Series, Favorite Drama Series, and Favorite Comedy Series, to more off-beat categories which differed by year and are listed below. The winners were voted on by readers via magazine ballots and on-line voting. Each of these three award ceremonies were broadcast on Fox.  The first award ceremony was televised on February 24, 1999 with 1.2 million fans voting. The second ceremony was aired on March 6, 2000, with 1.6 million fans voting. The third and final ceremony was aired on February 24, 2001, with 1.5 million fans voting, at which point the award was discontinued.

Among the winners were David Duchovny, Tim Allen, Roma Downey, Jenna Elfman, David James Elliott, Martin Sheen, Bette Midler, Regis Philbin, Sean Hayes, and Noah Wyle.

Select categories
 Favorite Sportscaster
 Favorite Sci-Fi/Fantasy Show
 Favorite TV Pet
 Favorite Teen Character
 Scariest Villain
 Best Kiss
 Sexiest Male
 Sexiest Female
 Best Dressed Male
 Best Dressed Female
 Favorite Teen Show
 Favorite Comeback
 Favorite Music Show
 Favorite Men's Hair-Do
 Favorite Women's Hair-Do
 Favorite TV Theme Song

References

External links
  (1999)
  (2000)
  (2001)

1999 establishments in the United States
2001 disestablishments in the United States
American television awards
Awards disestablished in 1964
Awards established in 1999
Awards disestablished in 2001